This is a list of diseases starting with the letter "X".

X
 X, disease
 X chromosome, duplication Xq13 1 q21 1
 X chromosome, monosomy Xp22 pter
 X chromosome, monosomy Xq28
 X chromosome, trisomy Xp3
 X chromosome, trisomy Xpter Xq13
 X chromosome, trisomy Xq
 X chromosome, trisomy Xq25
 X fragile site folic acid type

Xa–Xk
 Xanthic urolithiasis
 Xanthine oxydase deficiency
 Xanthinuria
 Xanthomatosis cerebrotendinous
 Xerocytosis, hereditary
 Xeroderma
 Xeroderma pigmentosum
 Xeroderma pigmentosum, type 1
 Xeroderma pigmentosum, type 2
 Xeroderma pigmentosum, type 3
 Xeroderma pigmentosum, type 5
 Xeroderma pigmentosum, type 6
 Xeroderma pigmentosum, type 7
 Xeroderma pigmentosum, variant type
 Xeroderma talipes enamel defects
 Xerophthalmia
 Xerostomia
 Xk aprosencephaly

Xl
 X-linked adrenal hypoplasia congenita
 X-linked adrenoleukodystrophy
 X-linked agammaglobulinemia
 X-linked alpha thalassemia mental retardation syndrome (ATR-X)
 X-linked dominance
 X-linked ichthyosis
 X-linked juvenile retinoschisis
 X-linked lymphoproliferative syndrome
 X-linked mental retardation
 X-linked mental retardation and macroorchidism
 X-linked mental retardation associated with marXq2
 X-linked mental retardation Brooks type
 X-linked mental retardation craniofacial abnormal microcephaly club
 X-linked mental retardation De silva type
 X-linked mental retardation Hamel type
 X-linked mental retardation type Gustavson
 X-linked mental retardation type Martinez
 X-linked mental retardation type Raynaud
 X-linked mental retardation type Schutz
 X-linked mental retardation type Snyder
 X-linked mental retardation type Wittner
 X-linked mental retardation-hypotonia
 X-linked severe combined immunodeficiency
 X-linked trait

Xx–Xy
 XX male syndrome
 XY Female
 XY gonadal agenesis syndrome
 XYY syndrome
 XXXX syndrome
 XXXXX syndrome

X